Love or Nothing is the 22nd studio album by Japanese singer-songwriter Miyuki Nakajima, released in October 1994.

The album produced one of her most successful hit singles "Between the Sky and You", which reached number-one on the Japanese Oricon chart. The song was featured in Ienakiko, the movie sequel movie to a TV drama series of the same title.

The number one success of "Between the Sky and You" led to the album Love or Nothing debuting at number-one on the Oricon chart, becoming her last chart-topping non-compilation album to date. Upon its release, the album gained Platinum certification by the Recording Industry Association of Japan for shipments of over 400,000 copies.

Track listing
All songs written and composed by Miyuki Nakajima, arranged by Ichizō Seo (except "Between the Sky and You", "Tenbin Bakari" and "Don't Fall Asleep" co-arranged by David Campbell).
"" – 5:00
"" – 5:40
"" – 5:21
"" – 5:23
"" – 5:23
"" – 4:51
"" – 6:08
"" – 5:43
"" – 4:52
 "You Never Need Me" – 8:26
"" – 4:12

Personnel
 Shigeru Suzuki – Electric guitar
 Nozomi Furukawa – Electric guitar
 Tsuyoshi Kon – Electric, Electric slide, pedal steel and dobro guitars
 Chūei Yoshikawa – Nylon guitar
 Tsugutoshi Gotō – Bass guitar
 Yasuo Tomikura – Bass guitar
 Akira Okazawa – Bass guitar
 Nobuo Kurata – Acoustic Piano, Hammond B3 and keyboards
 Jun Aoyama – Drums, marching drums
 Eiji Shimamura – Drums
 Toshihiko Furumura – Tenor sax
 Bill Bergman – Tenor sax
 Don Markese – Baritone sax
 Dennis Farias – Trumpet
 Andy Martin – Trombone
 Jon Clarke – Oboe, tin whistle
 Julia Waters – Background vocals
 Maxine Waters – Background vocals
 Oren Waters – Background vocals
 EVE – Background vocals
 Monalisa Young – Background vocals
 Joseph Powell – Background vocals
 Suginami Jidou Chorus – Background vocals
 David Campbell – Strings conductor
 Joel Derouin – Strings concertmaster
 Suzie Katayama – String contractor

Production
 Producer and Arranger: Ichizo Seo
 Composer, Writer, Producer and Performer: Miyuki Nakajima
 Arranger:Nobuo Kurata, David Campbell
 Engineer: Tad Gotoh,  Joe Chiccarelli, Kengo Katoh
 Mixer: Hiroshi Tokunaga, Tomotaka Takehara, Mike Baumagerther
 A&R: Yuzo Watanabe, Kohichi Suzuki
 Assistant: Katsuhisa Oura, Hideki Kodera, Junichi Hohrin, Yuichi Inoue, Mitsuyoshi Kishida, Koh Yamashita, Tomoaki Satoh, Atsushi Matsui, Bino Espinozza, Randy Wine
 Assistant for Producer: Tomoo Satoh
 Artist Promotor: Yoshio Kan
 Disc Promotor: Narihiko Yoshida, Shoko Sone
 Music Coordinator – Takashi Kimura, Fumio Miyata, Tomoko Takaya, Ruriko Duer, Sam Onoda
 Photographer and Art Director: Jin Tamura
 Designer: Hirofumi Arai
 Costume: Norio Suzuki
 Hair and Make-up: Noriko Izumisawa
 Location Coordinator: Tomiki Sugimura
 Artist Management: Kohji Suzuki
 Assistant: Maki Nishida
 Management Desk: Atsuko Hayashi
 General Management: Takahiro Uno
 DAD – Genichi Kawakami

Charts

Weekly charts

: Limited edition issued on APO-CD

Year-end charts

Certifications

References

Miyuki Nakajima albums
1994 albums
Pony Canyon albums